Seremban (Negeri Sembilan Malay: Soghomban, Somban; Jawi: سرمبن) is a city in the Seremban District and the capital of the state of Negeri Sembilan in Peninsular Malaysia. The city's administration is run by the Seremban City Council. Seremban gained its city status on 20 January 2020.

Toponymy 

Seremban was founded as Sungei Ujong (or Sungai Ujong), named after a nearby river of the same name. While the town was renamed Seremban thereafter, the name Sungai Ujong most prominently persists as a street name for a road adjoining the southern side of town (Sungai Ujong Road, or Jalan Sungai Ujong). It is also the name of a luak (chiefdom) that formed Negeri Sembilan, that covers the eponymous district as well as neighbouring Port Dickson District.

Among the Chinese-speaking community, the city is known as "fùhyùhng" in Cantonese and "fúróng" in Mandarin (literally "hibiscus"), which comes from a phonetic approximation of "Ujong" (using the Cantonese reading of the characters).

History 

Sungai Ujong, also known as Sening Ujong, as it was originally known, was an ancient settlement. It has been said in the Malay Annals that King Parameswara reportedly visited Sening Ujong after fleeing the kingdom of Singapura before ultimately establishing the Malacca Sultanate. The same settlement was also referred as Sang Hyang Ujong in Javanese accounts, notably the Nagarakretagama, as well as Suneujon in Godinho de Erédia's cartographic records, which dates back to 1613. Growth took off, as with most major towns in Peninsular Malaysia, after the discovery of tin ore in the 1870s. The discovery of tin in a nearby area called Rasah saw an influx of Arab, Malay and Chinese immigrants to work on the mines and trade there. Most of the local Malays were farmers.

Renamed as Seremban, the town flourished not only as a mining area but also a business centre. The Linggi River served as the sole outlet to ferry tin and supplies in and out of the town. Revenue came not only from tin trade but also from the large amount of taxes collected, much to the displeasure of the traders and the British colonialists at the neighbouring port of Malacca.

The local chieftains, namely the Dato' Kelana and the Dato' Shahbandar of Sungai Ujong were at odds with each other on the rights to collect taxes and ownership and control of the mines. The rivalry to assert influence and authority opened the door for British intervention in Negeri Sembilan. The British sided with the Dato' Kelana upon invitation and defeated the Dato' Bandar forces who was later sent into exile to Singapore. In a show of gratitude to the British for helping him win the war, the Dato' Kelana had no choice but to accept a British Resident whose job was to advise him on matters other than religion and Malay customs.

Captain Murray was appointed the first resident and later set-up his residence at Channer Road, now renamed Jalan Dato' Siamang Gagap. Soon after, the people living around Rasah moved to Channer Road for the sake of security and its orderly administration.

City status
Before 2020, Seremban was one of four state capitals that had yet to be elevated to city status (Malay: Bandar raya); the other three being Kota Bharu (Kelantan), Kuantan (Pahang) and Kangar (Perlis). To achieve city status, the state government had agreed to merge the Nilai Municipal Council and Seremban Municipal Council, with that decision being approved by the federal government in 2012.

Then Menteri Besar Datuk Seri Mohamad Hasan said during Tuanku Mukhriz's birthday

On 13 December 2017, then Menteri Besar of Negeri Sembilan, Mohamad Hasan stated that Seremban achieve city status in 2018. In order to get city status, both Seremban and Nilai Municipal Councils will be merged to form a new local authority, Seremban City Council. However, he said, the merging of the two entities would not involve reducing staff or higher assessment rates in the Seremban area, as increasing rates was not a prerequisite for attaining city status. 

In February 2018, a further announcement was made regarding the formation of Seremban City Hall (Dewan Bandaraya Seremban), which was poised to be completed in April. However, the official declaration of Seremban as a city will only occur in January 2019, in conjunction with the birthday of the state's ruler Tuanku Muhriz (January 14). After the change in the ruling coalition after the 14th General Election ushered in a new state government, the new Mentri Besar Aminuddin Harun announced his decision to push back the official promotion towards the end of the year, citing the inability of contractors to complete refurbishment works at the new City Hall in time. However, the postponement will allow the authorities time to iron out any flaws in Seremban's infrastructure and amenities.

Two municipal administrators, Seremban Municipal Council (Majlis Perbandaran Seremban) and Nilai Municipal Council (Majlis Perbandaran Nilai) officially merged into a new administrator, Seremban City Council (Majlis Bandaraya Seremban) on 1 January 2020. On 20 January, Seremban's status as a city was officialised in a declaration ceremony.

Geography and climate

Seremban is situated about 60 kilometres south of Kuala Lumpur, the capital city of Malaysia, 50 kilometres south of the administrative capital Putrajaya, and about 30 kilometres inland from the coast. Part of the Malaysia Vision Valley corridor and the National Growth Conurbation, Seremban is considered to be the southern limit of the Greater Kuala Lumpur metropolitan area. It is located in the Linggi River valley, at the western fringes of the Titiwangsa Mountains. The terrain is generally hilly, and the soil is mostly reddish laterite soil, suitable for the cultivation of rubber and palm oil, thus making Seremban the agricultural centre for the state. Since the establishment of Seremban, the Linggi River has played an important role in the city's growth. During the boom period of tin mining, the Linggi River served as the major transportation route for tin traders. Today, it is one of the major sources of water for the Seremban metropolitan area and Negeri Sembilan.

The climate of Seremban, like most parts of Peninsular Malaysia, is generally hot and humid (tropical) with a mean temperature of about 26–30 degrees Celsius. Most of the rainfall is experienced during the inter-monsoon periods of April and October. The weather remains generally dry for the rest of the year with occasional showers.

Transportation

Rail and air
The rail connection was first constructed in the late 1890s as a stop on the Kuala Lumpur–Singapore main line, and until today, the Seremban railway station still serves as one of the major stops along the line. The station also serves as the southern terminal of the Keretapi Tanah Melayu electrified commuter network, KTM Komuter, which links the city to Kuala Lumpur and the Klang Valley on Seremban Line. From October 2015 to November 2016, the Komuter service has been extended to Gemas, though passengers used to be required to alight at Seremban and switch trains to the Gemas extension line (much akin to the Tanjung Malim–Rawang stretch). However, after 2016, all KTM Komuter trains run to Sungai Gadut or Pulau Sebang-Tampin without requiring to alight at Seremban.

Negeri Sembilan is one of the two states in Malaysia that are not accessible via air transportation (Perlis being the other state). However, the Kuala Lumpur International Airport (KLIA) is less than a 30 minutes drive from Seremban, essentially making the airport closer to Seremban rather than Kuala Lumpur.

Road

Federal Route 1 is the oldest roadway that connects the towns and cities of the West Coast of Peninsular Malaysia running through Seremban. It connects Seremban with Rembau and Tampin to the south and Kajang, Selangor to the north. Seremban provides access to  Kuala Klawang through Federal Route 86, Kuala Pilah to the east through Federal Route 51 and the coastal town of Port Dickson through Federal Route 53 or SPDH to the west. The North–South Expressway serves Seremban at 4 exits (Exit 217 at Bandar Ainsdale, Exit 218 at Seremban, Exit 219 at Seremban-Port Dickson and Exit 220 at Senawang). The LEKAS Highway links Kajang in Selangor to Paroi on the eastern end of Seremban. The Jalan Labu Federal Route 362 connects Seremban to Labu and Nilai and Jalan Sungai Ujong Federal Route 241 serves Seremban 2 and Bandar Sri Sendayan.

Demographics
According to the 2010 census, there are 514,909 Malaysian citizens in the administrative district of Seremban. They consist of 56.4% Bumiputera, 26.2% Chinese and 17% Indian and 0.5% others excluding non-citizens. There are an additional 41,026 non-citizens.

Culture

Historically, Negeri Sembilan is influenced by the Minangkabaus and thus, Seremban is the centre of Minangkabau culture in Malaysia. Minangkabau  (menang kerbau in Malay) literally means "winning buffalo", are famous for their unique roof architecture which resembles buffalo horns. Many Seremban buildings showcase this feature, such as the Seremban  City Hall, the Wisma Negeri and the State Museum.

People of Negeri Sembilan are also known for the practising of the matrilineal custom called Adat Perpatih (Minangkabau language: Lareh Bodi Caniago), making Negeri Sembilan the only matrilineal state in Malaysia. The majority of Malaysia's states adhere to the patrilineal Adat Temenggung.

Sports

Seremban currently serves as the home ground of Negeri Sembilan FC football team. The team is the state representative of Negeri Sembilan in the first tier Malaysia Super League. They play their home games in the 45,000 capacity Tuanku Abdul Rahman Stadium which is located in Paroi on the eastern outskirt of the city.

Cuisine

Seremban is known for its special delicacies comprising Malay, Chinese, and Indian cuisine. Among the local cuisine is Seremban Siew Pau that is well known throughout the country. It is a flaky pastry bun filled with meat fillings traditionally pork or the halal chicken filling.

Seremban is also well known for its Nasi Padang or Minangkabau dishes. It is basically a meal of rice eaten with dishes from a recipe originating from Padang, Sumatra. One of the local dishes is Gulai Masak Lemak Cili Api which is fish or meat cooked in coconut gravy mixed with turmeric and cili padi (bird's eye chilli).

Seremban is famous for baked crabs with many establishments situated along Jalan Tuanku Munawir and beef noodles, especially the beef noodles food stalls here which have survived for more than a generation. Nowadays, these beef noodles attract tourists from outside the state to Seremban with its thick, slick gravy and peppery, sticky sauce sprinkled with peanuts, salted vegetables, spring onions and sesame seeds.

Local desserts include ABC or air batu campur meaning shaved ice with brown sugar syrup and rose flavouring, corn, beans, and cendol. To date, the cendol in Seremban touted to be better than renowned Teochew cendol of Penang.

Tourism
Seremban Square

Dubbed the fish pond, the name given to an area of open land in downtown Seremban area which has long been the synonym and subject of complaints of the city community has recently been given a new look. No more is there a barren, neglected view which was claimed to be the breeding ground for mosquitoes in the heart of Seremban city centre.

Recently, the Seremban Square (Malay: Dataran Seremban), which decorates the main entrance to the Seremban city, began to attract attention and has since turned into a tourist spot. In the Seremban Square area, the Malaysian flag is raised on a flagpole standing 100 ft high.

The Seremban Municipal Councils hoped that the Seremban Square, which began its operation in May 2008, would be appreciated and used properly. It was hoped that it would continue to be used by all walks of life, not just for the present but would continue to be a valuable heritage for the future generation.

Ostrich Farm

Renowned as a family recreational centre, the Jelita Ostrich Show Farm in Jalan Jelebu not only focuses on breeding activities in particular but also capitalises on all speciality of the bird species.

State Museum

The Negeri Sembilan Museum was established in 1953 when the 8th Yamtuan or Ruler of Negeri Sembilan, Tuanku Abdul Rahman gave his consent for the relocation of the Ampang Tinggi Palace from Kuala Pilah to the Taman Bunga at Jalan Dato' Hamzah, Seremban and was turned into the State Museum.

Seremban Lake Garden

Seremban Lake Garden is a recreational and leisure centre in Seremban which attracts many visitors, especially during public holidays and weekends. This Lake Garden is one of the oldest natural lake gardens in Malaysia.

Seremban 2 Recreational Park

Seremban residents and town folks searching for a recreational destination with the family come and visit the S2 City Park during weekends or school holidays. Arriving at this six-acre area, visitors will be greeted with the breath-taking landscapes as well as a variety of colourful kite decorations flying freely in the sky.

Malaysia Park

Malaysia Park is in line with the government's noble intention in ensuring that each town is modernised and parallel towards town greenery. the Seremban Municipal Council has identified Malaysia Park as one of the Public Parks that may be developed to accommodate the recreational and leisure and tourism needs for Seremban town.

Church of The Visitation

The Church of The Visitation is the oldest parish in the Roman Catholic Archdiocese of Kuala Lumpur since 1848. The church is located in Seremban town's centre with a sprawling 2 acres that include the historical Parochial House, Visitation Hall and Formation Centres, and the Wisma Visitation. Its neo-Gothic architecture is a central landmark of the town.

Centipede Temple

Perched on top of a hill in Ulu Temiang, Seremban lies the Centipede Temple (or Then Sze Temple). Centipedes roamed freely in and out of the temple grounds, and it is believed that if one spots a centipede, they can expect some good fortune.

City areas

Inner Seremban (Seremban city core)
Seremban
Rasah
Rasah Jaya
Rahang
Mambau
Senawang
Temiang
Lobak
Paroi
Bukit Chedang
Bukit Blossom
Seremban 2
 Rasah Kemayan
Ampangan
Oakland
Bukit Kepayang
Kemayan
Sikamat
Seremban 3
Taman Permai

Outer Seremban

Nilai
Bandar Baru Nilai
Rantau
Mantin
Sungai Gadut
Labu
Lenggeng
Taman Seremban Jaya
Bandar Seremban Selatan
Taman Tuanku Jaafar
Seremban 2 Heights
Bandar Sri Sendayan
Bandar Ainsdale
Gadong Jaya
Bandar Enstek
Pantai
Ulu Beranang
Pajam

Seremban 2

Seremban 2 is a new satellite township about 4 kilometres south-east of the existing old Seremban town centre. Located on the western side of the North–South Expressway, Seremban 2 is a planned township built on former oil palm estate land to relocate the administrative and business district from the crowded old town centre to a more organised area.

Seremban District administrative offices
Seremban Court Complex.
District Police headquarters
State Fire and Rescue Station headquarters

The RM2 billion township will also sustain a large portion of the population of Seremban through various housing estate projects in and around Seremban 2 such as
Green Street Homes
Sri Carcosa
Central Park
Emerald Park
Garden Homes
Garden Avenue
Garden City Homes
Vision Homes
S2 Heights
Park Avenue
Pearl 132

The residents here enjoy many facilities with ÆON Seremban 2 Shopping Centre, City Park, Seremban 2's very own Lake Gardens and comparably less traffic than the city centre.

Economy
Since its early days, being an administrative centre has helped cement Seremban's place as the region's primate city. The state, which been home to several multinationals from Japan, South Korea, the United States and the European Union. The manufacturing sector today forms the backbone of the state economy, contributing almost half of the state's gross domestic product (GDP), followed by services and tourism (40.3%), agriculture (6%), construction (2.2%) and mining (0.3%).

Retail

Seremban is the business and commercial centre for most towns and villages in Negeri Sembilan. During the weekends, residents from outlying areas come to Seremban by commuter train or buses to shop in Seremban. Amway opened their first concept shop in Seremban in August 2008 as an ongoing expansion strategy to give its distributors and customers a new shopping experience.

Terminal One Shopping Centre is located at the heart of Seremban. It was built in 1996.

AEON Seremban 2, one of the premier shopping destinations in the city, was the only ÆON outlet operated in the state until February 2010, when ÆON launched their grand opening of ÆON Big at Seremban Forest Heights that replaced the old Carrefour. The latter was then refurbished to house the newly formed Seremban City Council, following the merger of two separate municipal authorities of Seremban and Nilai Municipal Councils.

Besides T1 and AEON, many shopping outlets are concentrated in the city centre; Wisma Punca Emas, KM Plaza, The Store, Palm Mall, Era Square and Parkson Seremban Prima which replaced Seremban Parade. In addition, several new malls were also opened in Nilai, such as AEON Nilai and MesaMall. As the population increased over time, it attracted five major hypermarket chains in Malaysia to set up outlets in Seremban, namely Giant Hypermarket, Lotus's, Econsave and Mydin (2 outlets).

Apart from shopping complexes, Seremban contains many neighbouring commercial districts including Taman AST, Era Square, Permai Avenue, Oakland, Kemayan Square and others.

Seremban also has designated numerous zones in the city to market locally manufactured products such as antiques, textiles, fabrics and handicrafts. The local municipal council has gazetted Jalan Utam Singh as a morning flea market during the weekend. In 2009, Sungai Ujong Walk located in Jalan Dr. Murugesu was opened by the local council president. The walk follows the example of the well known Jonker Street in Malacca, providing 72 business sites with 30 lots selling foodstuffs and beverages. The rest of the space serves as a stage for performances and cultural shows. It is envisioned as a future location that will revive the atmosphere at night besides enlivening the surrounding areas.

Infrastructure

Health

Seremban has many hospitals and medical centres, which include a government hospital and private-owned hospitals.

Tuanku Ja'afar Hospital, formerly known as Seremban General Hospital is the state and referral hospital for the state of Negeri Sembilan. Established in 1930 with a total capacity of 800 beds and 20 clinical specialities and various supportive services.

The other hospitals include Columbia Asia Medical Center, which opened in 1999 and now has 80 beds and offers outpatient and inpatient specialist services, a 24-hour clinic and emergency services.

In 2004 a new hospital was established, Seremban Specialist Hospital, which has a total capacity of 109 beds. The hospital located at the outskirt of Seremban, which is just behind the State Museum.

Negeri Sembilan Chinese Maternity Hospital is also a private hospital that has 75 beds. It located along Jalan Tun Ismail.

There is also a hospital in Senawang, the 101 beds Senawang Specialist Hospital (SSH) opened in 2008.

Politics
Seremban is currently represented in the Dewan Rakyat of the Malaysian Parliament by Anthony Loke Siew Fook of the DAP.

On the state level, Seremban supplies 6 seats to the Negeri Sembilan State Legislative Assembly:
 Nilai;
 Lenggeng;
 Lobak;
 Temiang;
 Sikamat; and
 Ampangan.
Currently the DAP controls three out of these six seats: Nilai, Lobak and Temiang; PKR holds Sikamat and Ampangan while Lenggeng is currently held by AMANAH.

Certain wards of Seremban, though administered by the Seremban City Council, are actually located in other parliamentary constituencies; for instance, Paroi is represented by Rembau constituency, while Mambau, Bukit Kepayang, Rahang and Senawang are located within the borders of Rasah parliamentary constituency.

Notable people
 Anthony Loke Siew Fook, Secretary-General of the Democratic Action Party (DAP).
 Jackie M. (Tang), Sydney-based acclaimed Malaysian cook and the founder of Masters of Malaysian Cuisine, a group of global elite Malaysian chefs involved in promoting Malaysian cuisine primarily through virtual live video and other online content.
Nabil Ahmad, a comedian.
 Thiruvenkatar Kishnapillai JP, later Chris Pillai, the first Malaysia-born mayor of Calderdale, West Yorkshire, England.
 Siti Nordiana, a singer and an actress.
 Yong Nyuk Lin, former minister of Singapore.

Twinning
  Bandung, Indonesia.
  Bukittinggi, Indonesia.

References

External links 

 
 Majlis Perbandaran Seremban 
 KTM Komuter Seremban Station
 Seremban Maya
 Virtual Drive Through Street of Seremban
 Seremban Live